Katie Doar (born 11 September 2001) is a field hockey player from New Zealand, who plays as a midfielder.

Personal life
Katie Doar was born and raised in Whangārei. She has an elder sister, Madison, who has also represented New Zealand in field hockey. Doar attended Kamo Intermediate School and Whangarei Girls' High School before boarding at St Cuthbert's College in Auckland.

Career

Domestic leagues

Ford National Hockey League
In 2019, Hockey New Zealand overhauled the National Hockey League. Until the conclusion of the league, Doar was a member of the Auckland team.

Premier Hockey League
Following the overhaul of the NHL, Doar was named in the Northern Tridents squad for New Zealand's new premier domestic competition, the Premier Hockey League. In the inaugural season of the league, Doar played in each game, helping the team to a silver medal.

National teams

Under-21
Katie Doar made her debut for the New Zealand U-21 team in 2018 during a Trans–Tasman test series against Australia in Hastings.

She followed this up with an appearance at a Tri–Nations tournament in Canberra.

Black Sticks
Doar made her senior debut for the Black Sticks in 2019, during season one of the FIH Pro League.

References

External links
 
 
 
 
 
 

2001 births
Living people
Female field hockey midfielders
Field hockey players at the 2020 Summer Olympics
Olympic field hockey players of New Zealand
Field hockey players at the 2022 Commonwealth Games
People educated at Whangarei Girls' High School
People educated at St Cuthbert's College, Auckland
Field hockey players from Whangārei
21st-century New Zealand women